Toyota Motors Higashi-Fuji F.C. was a Japanese football club based in Shizuoka. The club has played in the former Japan Football League.

External links
Football of Japan

Football clubs in Japan
1993 disestablishments in Japan
Sports teams in Shizuoka Prefecture
Toyota
Japan Football League (1992–1998) clubs
Works association football clubs in Japan